Captain America and Nick Fury: Blood Truce, also known as Captain America/Nick Fury: Blood Truce is a fortyeight page comic book one-shot published by Marvel Comics in 1995.

Publication history
The one-shot was written by Howard Chaykin, who had worked on many other Nick Fury projects before and Ben Schwartz. It was published on February 1, 1995.

Plot
Captain America and Nick Fury uncover a rogue faction of S.H.I.E.L.D. operatives determined to undermine a delicate international situation brought about by the defection of former KGB interrogator Dimitri Panshin. The rogue faction seek to make Panshin pay for his crimes. Only by siding with the Titanium Man, and A.I.M., can they save the world from an onslaught of nuclear holocaust.

Reception
The reviewer of NickFuryAgentofShield.com stated that although the comic features a lot of common tropes of Nick Fury stories it has some really nice art and dialogue. The book was ranked second on Diamonds highest selling paperbacks in February 1995.

See also
 1995 in comics

References

External links

Captain America titles
Nick Fury titles
Comics by Howard Chaykin